Nqubeko Sithembiso Zulu (born 25 July 1987) is a South African professional rugby union player, who plays for the Wanderers and the . His regular position is lock.

Career

Youth / Golden Lions

Zulu was born in Durban, Zulu grew up in Johannesburg. He went to Parktown Boys' High School and in 2005, he earned a call-up to the  squad that won the unofficial final of the Under-18 Craven Week competition held in Bloemfontein.

Sharks

After graduating high school, he returned to Durban to join the Sharks Academy, where he represented the  side in the 2006 Under-19 Provincial Championship and the  side in the 2007 Under-21 Provincial Championship.

He also featured in their quarter-final match against , which they lost 14–22 to be eliminated from the competition.

Zulu once again played in the 2009 Vodacom Cup, with the team now called . He made four appearances off the bench during a regular season that saw the side win all six of their matches.

UP Tuks

In 2011, he was a member of the  squad that played in the 2011 Varsity Cup competition. He played more rugby with them in the Carlton League for the remainder of 2011 and returned for the 2012 Varsity Cup, but due to injury he made only two appearances in their final two matches in the regular season.

Pumas

In 2012, he was included in the  squad prior to the 2012 Currie Cup First Division competition. One more start and three appearances as a replacement followed for the remainder of the regular season as the Pumas finished second on the log.

Blue Bulls / Wanderers

Zulu was included in the  squad for the 2013 Vodacom Cup and made four appearances as a replacement during the regular season of the competition, helping them to wins in each of those four matches, including a 110–0 victory over competition newcomers  in Lephalale.

In 2014, he joined Wanderers, helping them to second position in the 2014 Golden Lions Pirates Grand Challenge to qualify to the 2015 SARU Community Cup. He started all four appearances of their matches in the pool stages, helping Wanderers to two wins, one draw and one defeat to qualify for the semi-finals.

References

South African rugby union players
Living people
1987 births
Rugby union players from Durban
Rugby union locks
Blue Bulls players
Sharks (Currie Cup) players
Pumas (Currie Cup) players
Alumni of Parktown Boys' High School